Monochroa kumatai is a moth of the family Gelechiidae. It was described by Sakamaki in 1996. It is found in Japan (Hokkaido, Honshu) and Korea.

The wingspan is 11.9-12.4 mm. The plical and discal stigmata are obscure, blackish, and somewhat elongated longitudinally. There are two ochreous, obliquely narrow, triangular blotches on the costa at the apical one-third of the wing and also on the tornus. Four purely white minute dots are located between the costal triangular blotch and the apex and four similar dots are found on the termen. The hindwings are pale fuscous.

References

Moths described in 1996
Monochroa